Ubiquitin-conjugating enzyme E2 D3 is a protein that in humans is encoded by the UBE2D3 gene.

Function 

The modification of proteins with ubiquitin is an important cellular mechanism for targeting abnormal or short-lived proteins for degradation. Ubiquitination involves at least three classes of enzymes: ubiquitin-activating enzymes, or E1s, ubiquitin-conjugating enzymes, or E2s, and ubiquitin-protein ligases, or E3s. This gene encodes a member of the E2 ubiquitin-conjugating enzyme family. This enzyme functions in the ubiquitination of the tumor-suppressor protein p53, which is induced by an E3 ubiquitin-protein ligase. Multiple spliced transcript variants have been found for this gene, but the full-length nature of some variants has not been determined.

Interactions 

UBE2D3 has been shown to interact with NEDD4.

References

Further reading